Crassispira lavanonoensis is a species of sea snail, a marine gastropod mollusc in the family Pseudomelatomidae.

Description
The length of the shell attains 13 mm.

Distribution
This marine species occurs off Southern Madagascar

References

External links
 

lavanonoensis
Gastropods described in 2008